Man-lei Wong was a Chinese actress from Hong Kong. Wong was credited with over 300 films. Wong had a star at Avenue of Stars in Hong Kong.

Early life 
In 1913, Wong was born in Hong Kong.

Education 
Wong attended Belilios Teachers College, an Italian missionary college.

Career 
In 1930, at age 17, Wong's acting career began in silent film in Shanghai, China. Wong appeared in Burns the White-Bird Temple (1930) and 24 Heroes (1930). In 1932, Wong became a Hong Kong actress. Wong played a  rich girl in silent film Gunshot at Midnight (1932) directed by Moon Kwan Man-Ching and she was Chiu Ching-Ha in Cry of the Cuckoo in the Temple (1932) directed by Leung Siu-Bo. In 1935, Wong was Yuet Han in Yesterday's Song, a talking Cantonese drama film directed by Chiu Shu-San. In 1952, Wong co-founded Union Film Enterprise. Wong's last notable film is Sword That Vanquished The Monster, a 1969 film directed by Wu Pang. Wong is credited with over 300 films. Wong is notable for her role as an obnoxious mother-in-law and elderly woman.

Filmography

Films 
This is a partial list of films.
 1930 Burns the White-Bird Temple 
 1930 24 Heroes 
 1932 Gunshot at Midnight - Rich girl
 1932 Cry of the Cuckoo in the Temple - Chiu Ching-Ha
 1936 New Youth 
 1947 The Fickle Lady - Lok Kuen-See
 1953 A Flower Reborn
 1954 Spring's Flight 
 1955 Cold Nights - Man Suen's mother.
 1955 Parents' Hearts - Mother 
 1956 The House of Sorrows 
 1956 The Wall - Mrs. Kong 
 1956 Wilderness - Blind mother
 1959 The Fake Marriage (aka Great Pretender) 
 1959 Money (aka Qian) - Chiu's wife.
 1961 Long Live the Money - Chui's mother.
 1962 Vampire Woman - Madam Chiu
 1964 The Paradise Hotel 
 1964 A Mad Woman - Madam Wong 
 1965 Doomed Love (aka A Love's Tragedy) - Au Oi-Ching 
 1966 No Greater Love than Filial Piety
 1966 Love Burst - Kong's aunt 
 1969 Sword That Vanquished The Monster
 1986 Dream Lovers - Lei's blind grandmother

Awards 
 1995 Lifetime Achievement Award. Presented by Hong Kong Film Awards.
 Star. Avenue of Stars. Tsim Sha Tsui waterfront in Hong Kong.

Personal life 
During the Japanese occupation in December 1941, Wong fled to Macau, then lived in Guangzhouwan, and then Vietnam. In 1946, Wong returned to live in Hong Kong.

On April 8, 1998, Wong died in Hong Kong.

See also 
 Hong Kong Film Award for Lifetime Achievement
 Yin Pak

References

External links 
 Wong Man Lei at hkcinemagic.com
 Wong Man Lei at hkmdb.com
 Man Lei Wong at imdb.com
 Mary Wong Man-lei in Hong Kong Cinema: A Cross-cultural View, page 246

1913 births
1998 deaths
Chinese silent film actresses
Hong Kong film actresses